Monique Riesterer-Ludwigs (born 6 December 1971 in Rheinfelden) was a German weightlifter, competing in the +75 kg category and representing Germany at international competitions.

She participated at the 2000 Summer Olympics in the +75 kg event. She competed at world championships, most recently at the 2002 World Weightlifting Championships.

Major results

References

External links
 

1971 births
Living people
German female weightlifters
Weightlifters at the 2000 Summer Olympics
Olympic weightlifters of Germany
People from Rheinfelden (Baden)
Sportspeople from Freiburg (region)